The 5th BET Awards took place at the Kodak Theatre in Los Angeles, California on June 28, 2005. The awards recognized Americans in music, acting, sports, and other fields of entertainment over the past year. Actors Will Smith and Jada Pinkett Smith hosted the event for the first time.

Performances
The Fugees - "Ready or Not", "Fu-Gee-La", "Killing Me Softly"
Missy Elliott feat Ciara and Fatman Scoop - "Lose Control"
The Game feat Mary J. Blige - "Dreams", "Hate it or Love it"
Destiny's Child - "Cater 2 U"
John Legend feat Stevie Wonder - "Ordinary People"
T.I. feat P$C and Sheila E. - "U Don't Know Me", "Bring Em Out"
Mariah Carey - "We Belong Together"
Faith Evans, Toni Braxton, Gladys Knight - Gladys Knight Tribute - "Love Overboard", "Save the Overtime (For Me)", "Best Thing That Ever Happened to Me", "If I Were Your Woman", "Neither One of Us (Wants to Be the First to Say Goodbye)", "Midnight Train to Georgia"
Omarion - "O", "Touch"
Ciara feat Ludacris - "Oh", "1, 2 Step"
Mike Jones feat Slim Thug and Paul Wall - "Back Then", "Still Tippin'
Stevie Wonder - "So What the Fuss", "Happy Birthday"

Awards and nominations
Video of the Year
 Kanye West for "Jesus Walks"
 Amerie for "1 Thing"
 Jay Z for "99 Problems"
 John Legend for "Ordinary People"
 Snoop Dogg for "Drop It Like It's Hot" featuring Pharrell Williams

Viewer's Choice
 Omarion for "O"
 Destiny's Child for "Soldier" featuring Lil Wayne and T.I.
 Ciara for "1, 2 Step" featuring Missy Elliott
 Mario for "Let Me Love You"
 Terror Squad for "Lean Back" featuring Fat Joe and Remy Ma
 T.I. for "U Don't Know Me"

Best Collaboration
 Ciara for "1, 2 Step" featuring Missy Elliott
 Usher for "My Boo" featuring Alicia Keys
 Snoop Dogg for "Drop It Like It's Hot" featuring Pharrell Williams
 Jadakiss for "Why" featuring Anthony Hamilton
 The Game for "Hate It or Love It" featuring 50 Cent
 Destiny's Child for "Soldier" featuring Lil Wayne and T.I.

Best New Artist
 John Legend
 Fantasia
 The Game
 Ciara
 Omarion

Best Group
 Destiny's Child
 112
 Terror Squad
 Lil Jon and the East Side Boyz
 The Roots

Best Gospel Artist
 Donnie McClurkin
 Ruben Studdard
 Fred Hammond
 CeCe Winans
 Kanye West

Best Female Hip-Hop Artist
 Remy Ma
 Jacki-O
 Miri Ben-Ari
 Shawnna

Best Male Hip-Hop Artist
 Kanye West
 50 Cent
 Jay Z
 Ludacris
 Snoop Dogg
 T.I.

Best Female R&B Artist
 Alicia Keys
 Jill Scott
 Amerie
 Mariah Carey
 Ciara
 Fantasia

Best Male R&B Artist
 Usher
 Anthony Hamilton
 John Legend
 Mario
 Prince

Best Actress
 Regina King
 Queen Latifah
 Kimberly Elise
 Gabrielle Union
 Halle Berry

Best Actor
 Jamie Foxx
 Morgan Freeman
 Mos Def
 Don Cheadle
 Will Smith

Best Female Athlete of the Year
 Serena Williams
 Gail Devers
 Lisa Leslie
 Venus Williams
 Laila Ali

Best Male Athlete of the Year
 Shaquille O'Neal
 Tiger Woods
 LeBron James
 Donovan McNabb
 Allen Iverson

Lifetime Achievement Award
 Gladys Knight

Humanitarian Award
 Denzel Washington and Pauletta Washington

References

External links
 BET Awards website

BET Awards